Nowhere but Up is a memoir written by Pattie Mallette (the mother of Canadian pop singer Justin Bieber) with A.J. Gregory. It was based on Justin Bieber's song "Up" from the album My World 2.0. The novel follows Mallette's struggle as a teenager through drugs and theft to finding God and having a child at 18 years old.

Published in September 2012, the book entered the New York Times Best Seller list at number 17 during the first week of release.

References 

Canadian memoirs
2012 non-fiction books